Al-Noor Academy (Arabic: أكاديمية النور, Academy of Light) is an Islamic middle and high school in Mansfield, Massachusetts. It is also associated with the Islamic Academy of New England - an elementary school in Sharon, Massachusetts.

Faculty

The Mathematics Department at Al-Noor Academy designed an advanced mathematics curriculum. Students complete Algebra I in eighth grade. In high school, they cover Geometry and Algebra II. This is equivalent to honor classes in public schools. Students also get in touch with their Muslim Mathematics heritage by researching famous mathematicians in history. This is an experience that is unique to the school.

The sciences covered at Al-Noor vary from earth, physical and life sciences in middle school to Chemistry and Biology in high school. Lab classes are a key component of the sciences curricula, and the school recently opened a new state-of-the-art science laboratory. Students are required to continue lab classes even when they join Dual Enrollment, an exclusive Al-Noor program which finds junior and seniors taking academic subjects on area college campuses. Thus, it is possible with careful planning to graduate from Al-Noor and concurrently receive an associate degree.

To be Dual Enrollment qualified, the students must have a high GPA. The students take courses at Bridgewater State University, Quincy College, Bristol College, and Harvard University Extension, enabling them to fulfill their high school requirements and at the same time gain college credits in Math, Science, and humanities. Dual Enrollment students take Arabic, Islamic studies, and Qur'an at Al-Noor Academy.

Curriculum

The Arabic curricula are stronger than that of most Arabic countries. The Arabic classes are divided into three levels: beginners, intermediate, and advanced. The advanced Arabic curriculum is made up of Reading and Comprehension (Deerassat Nussuss), Grammar (Qawa3id), Writing (Insha’a), and Poetry (Adab).

Physical Activities

The school obtained permission from the town to use its public park which has many facilities that serve the purpose of the school's physical activities. Meanwhile, to increase in more physical activity, the school has managed to purchase some fitness equipment and has transformed one of the classrooms into a fitness center. ANA has also converted one of its parking lots into an outdoor gym which the students are using on a daily basis and after school hours. The school is in process of rekindling teams in soccer, basketball, football and aerobics, led by certified instructors. Our boys' Physical Education instructor most recently served on the training staff of the NFL New England Patriots, as well as an individual trainer for PGA athletes.

Extra Curricular

Likewise, the school is placing a precedence to relight the many established clubs in the past. The latter helped to channel a variety of extracurricular activities. This includes, but is not limited to: journalism (Arabic and English), Anasheed, future Imams, libraries, theater, cooking, poetry, fitness...etc. The school had participated in local outreach and community service events. Moreover, to enhance the experience in the arts at ANA, the school had hired a highly qualified teacher with 20 years of arts teaching experience.

In addition, Al-Noor's curricula are enriched by many events and extracurricular activities. There are three fairs that mark each trimester: the science fair, the humanities fair and the Islamic fair. The school also plans few field trips each year. The students’ favorite extracurricular event is the monthly Qiyam. The Jummu’ah or Friday prayer is led occasionally by some high school students. The school participates in a number of activities and competitions on the local and the state level; they are all listed in the school calendar in the school's website.

College Acceptance
 Al-Noor's college acceptance rate since its 2000 founding is a remarkable 100 percent, including renowned institutions. Students were accepted to over 23 schools: Northeastern, Brandeis, Ana Maria, Massachusetts College of Pharmacy and Health Sciences (MCPHS), Boston University, University of Missouri, Providence College, University of Rhode Island (URI), Suffolk, UMass, Amherst, UMass Boston, UMass Lowell, UMass Dartmouth, Wentworth Institute of Technology, Stony Brook University, St. Bonaventure University, Simmons, Union College, Drexel, Virginia Commonwealth University, New Jersey Institute of Technology, Regis College, Curry College, and St. Louis University Medical Scholars Program. Many of the graduates earned not only their bachelor's degree but also master's and PhD's.

References

Private middle schools in Massachusetts
Private high schools in Massachusetts
Islamic schools in Massachusetts
Schools in Bristol County, Massachusetts